Kanichi Fujiwara is a Japanese long-distance motorcycle rider and writer.

Journeys

Between May 1987 and August 1999 he journeyed several continents with a number of small motorcycles including a Honda Super Cub, 50 cc Honda Motra and Honda Gorilla utility minibikes, and a Honda Dio scooter. His 1995 trip around Japan was documented in his 1997 book The Original Bike Bastard Starving Around Japan.

Between March 2004 and May 2008 he made a  journey circumnavigating the world on a Yamaha Passol electric scooter, on a route including Australia from Sydney to Perth, Thailand, India to Lisbon, South Africa to Kenya, and America from New York to San Francisco (44 countries). It may have been the first global circumnavigation by electric two-wheeler. Fujiwara visited and documented the sites of sacred trees in various countries to spread awareness of green transportation.

Even with six batteries giving a 100 km range, his partner had to shuttle charged batteries to him in order to cross Australia's Nullarbor Plain.

Between April 2009 and November 2013, he rode 100,000 kilometers across Japan's major highways on a 50 cc Honda Cub, sponsored by motorcycle apparel supplier Rough & Road, and supported by serializing his journeys in the Japanese magazine Tandem Style and on his own blog.

Online journalism
In addition to various blogs covering his motorcycle travels, Fujiwara is also a food critic.  His "Tabigohan" column covers road food at roadside stations and other Japanese venues for BBB-Bike, an online publication of large Japanese auction house BDS.

Bibliography

Notes and references

Notes

References

External links
 
Long distance rides at World Touring Network—Japan 

Long-distance motorcycle riders
Motorcycle touring writers
Japanese motorsport people
People from Iwate Prefecture
1961 births
Living people
Food writers